Percy Phillips may refer to:

Percy Phillips (rugby union) (1869–1947), Welsh rugby union player
Percy Francis Phillips (1896–1984), sound engineer and owner of Phillips' Sound Recording Services
Percy W. Phillips (1892–1969), judge of the United States Tax Court

See also
Edwin Percy Phillips (1884–1967), South African botanist and taxonomist